Charles Guy Briggle (January 27, 1883 – June 6, 1972) was a United States district judge of the United States District Court for the Southern District of Illinois.

Education and career

Born in Rushville, Illinois, Briggle received a Bachelor of Laws from the University of Illinois College of Law in 1904. He was in private practice in Morris, Illinois from 1905 to 1907, and in Springfield, Illinois from 1907 to 1927, also serving as a Master in Chancery for the Illinois Circuit Court in Sangamon County from 1917 to 1927. He then served as a Judge of the Illinois Circuit Court in Sangamon County until 1932.

Federal judicial service

On January 8, 1932, Briggle was nominated by President Herbert Hoover to a new seat on the United States District Court for the Southern District of Illinois created by 46 Stat. 1196. He was confirmed by the United States Senate on January 20, 1932, and received his commission on January 25, 1932. He served as Chief Judge from 1948 to 1958, assuming senior status on August 1, 1958. He served in that capacity until his death on June 6, 1972.

References

Sources
 

1883 births
1972 deaths
Illinois state court judges
Judges of the United States District Court for the Southern District of Illinois
United States district court judges appointed by Herbert Hoover
20th-century American judges
People from Rushville, Illinois
People from Springfield, Illinois
Place of death missing